Batrachedra busiris is a moth in the family Batrachedridae. It is found in Florida.

References

Natural History Museum Lepidoptera generic names catalog

Batrachedridae
Moths described in 1966